USS West Apaum (ID-3221) was a cargo ship in the United States Navy during World War I. She had been built as SS West Apaum for the United States Shipping Board (USSB) as part of the West boats, a series of steel-hulled cargo ships built on the West Coast of the United States.

West Apaum sailed on three voyages for the US Navy, two after the Armistice, before she was decommissioned in July 1919. Though little is available regarding West Apaums civilian career, it is known that she was sailing on a New York – Rotterdam route in early 1927. By early 1929, West Apaum had been laid up by the USSB, which abandoned her in 1933. The cargo ship was scrapped in the second quarter of that same year.

Design and construction 
The West ships were cargo ships of similar size and design built by several shipyards on the West Coast of the United States for the United States Shipping Board for emergency use during World War I. All were given names that began with the word West, like West Apaum, one of some 24 West ships built by Skinner & Eddy of Seattle, Washington.

West Apaum (Skinner & Eddy No. 23, USSB No. 88) was laid down on 19 March 1918, launched on 23 May, and delivered to the Navy upon completion on 19 June. West Apaum was built in a total of 78 working days, 92 calendar days, and was tied with three other ships for tenth place on a list of the ten fastest constructed ocean-going vessels compiled in 1920. Skinner & Eddy received a $25,000 bonus for completing the ship early.

The ship had a single triple-expansion steam engine powered by three coal-fired boilers that drove her single screw propeller, and moved the ship at a  pace.

Military career 
USS West Apaum (ID-3221) was commissioned into the Naval Overseas Transportation Service (NOTS) on 20 June 1918.

West Apaum departed Bremerton, Washington, on 27 June for Arica, Chile, to take on a cargo of nitrates for the United States. Sailing from there via the Panama Canal, West Apaum arrived at Savannah, Georgia, on 9 September. From there she sailed for Hampton Roads, Virginia, where she arrived on 10 October. Eight days later, loaded with rolling stock, steel rails, and other general cargo for the United States Army, the cargo ship sailed for France. Delayed at Halifax for repairs to her damaged propeller, West Apaum finally entered the harbor at La Pallice on 22 November, 11 days after the Armistice.

West Apaum unloaded her railroad goods, loaded  of Army cargo, and headed for the United States on 13 December. She arrived at Hampton Roads on 3 January 1919. West Apaum made two more voyages to France under Navy control. On her final voyage, she carried airplane materials to France and returned  of Army ordnance to New York on 11 July. On 25 July, West Apaum was decommissioned and returned to the USSB.

Civilian career 
Little is known about West Apaums subsequent civilian career. In the first quarter of 1927, it is known that West Apaum was sailing on a New York – Rotterdam route. While in this service, The New York Times, in one of just a few mentions the ship received in contemporary news coverage, reported on the transfer of one of West Apaums crew members to the United States Lines ocean liner  at sea. The crewman had fallen into an open hatchway and had fractured his skull. The crewman, though successfully transferred to Republic, died several hours later.

No further information on West Apaums career is available, but it is known that she was abandoned by the USSB in 1933, and scrapped in the second quarter of that year.

Notes

References

Bibliography

External links 
 

 

Design 1013 ships
Design 1013 ships of the United States Navy
Ships built by Skinner & Eddy
1918 ships
World War I cargo ships of the United States
World War I auxiliary ships of the United States